Eilat Stone is a gemstone that derives its name from the city of Eilat in Israel, where it was once mined. It is characterized by a green-blue heterogeneous mixture of several secondary copper minerals, including malachite, azurite, turquoise, pseudomalachite, and chrysocolla. Eilat stone is the national stone of Israel, and is also known as the King Solomon Stone.

References

Geology of Israel
Stones
Solomon
National symbols of Israel

Eilat
Copper minerals